Morgan (born 2007) is a female orca who was rescued in the Wadden Sea, off the northwestern coast of the Netherlands in June 2010. She was found in an unhealthy condition, severely underweight and malnourished. She lived several months at the Dolfinarium Harderwijk in the Netherlands. After it became clear that the basin at Dolfinarium was too small, multiple options were considered, including releasing Morgan and transferring her to another facility. Over a year later, after litigation and debate between scientists, a Dutch court ruled that she was to be moved. Morgan was transported to the Loro Parque in Spain in November 2011.

History
The orca, now named Morgan, was administered medical assistance and provided with food. The reason for the orca's rescue was emaciation (weighing approximately ) and likely also dehydration.

Public controversy
Controversy surrounds Morgan, as she was rescued with the provision that she was not to be displayed to the public and that she would be released back into the wild when she had recovered. However, the Harderwijk Dolfinarium and the Free Morgan Foundation, composed of independent international experts, have come to loggerheads over Morgan's future.  The Free Morgan Foundation includes the orca research and education organisations of Orcalab, Orca Network, Orca Research Trust, Centre for Whale Research, and Project SeaWolf Coastal Protection. It also includes the conservation and animal welfare groups the Cetacean Society International, Whale and Dolphin Conservation Society and the International Marine Mammal Project of Earth Island, as well as their affiliated scientists and experts.

Currently, the Harderwijk Dolfinarium has advised that they wish to ship Morgan to another captive marine mammal facility after an independent team of experts concluded that she is not a suitable candidate for release into the wild.  Yet the Free Morgan Foundation presented a detailed rehabilitation and release plan which to date (June 2011) has not openly been considered by those who hold her.

The Free Morgan Foundation rehabilitation and release plan included a number of phases with contingency plans.  The plan incorporated a ‘soft-release’ where Morgan would first be moved to a sea-pen and care for her would continue.  The process would, should her health allow, also involve taking Morgan out into the open sea to increase her fitness and reacquaint her with the area.  During that time she would be provided with food whilst she continued to readapt to the wild (somewhat like a half-way house for people who are in the process of reintegrating into society).

An attempt to release a captive orca back into the wild has only been conducted once – resulting in a partial success for Keiko, the star in the movie Free Willy. The Canadian and United States governments have also successfully released and reintegrated a rescued orca named A73, or Springer, a situation which bore certain similarities to that of Morgan. Springer, like Morgan, was found alone, many miles from where her family pod is resident and in an emaciated condition. After being kept in a sea pen in Puget Sound and nursed back to health, Springer was then transferred to a sea pen off of northern Vancouver Island from where she was ultimately released. She successfully reintegrated with a resident British Columbia orca pod and is still with that pod today.

Morgan's case, however, has some key differences to that of Springer. The Northern Resident population of orcas which Springer is a part of have been intensively studied for many decades, with all individuals and the majority of family relations known to researchers. Although Morgan has been reliably established to be a member of the Norwegian fish eating population from call analyses, it has proved impossible to establish her family group. This has tremendous complications for release with animals as family focused as orcas.

Despite some similarities, Morgan's situation is different from that of Luna, a young male orca who became isolated in the Nootka Sound area of Vancouver Island, Canada.  In that instance, Luna was never taken into captivity of any form and no official attempts were made to rehabilitate him back into the orca society he came from.  Luna died when he was presumed to be run over by a tugboat. Luna's case does show, however, that a young stranded orca is capable of surviving and hunting on its own, an argument that the Dolphinarium attempted to ignore.

Despite the original agreement that she would not be shown to the public, Morgan was displayed by the Dolphinarium only two months after she was taken into captivity. The dolphinarium made no attempt to pursue any rehabilitation and release plan despite the arguments of the Free Morgan Foundation that Morgan was an excellent candidate for a rehabilitation attempt similar to the successful rehabilitation of Springer.

Support for Morgan's release has also come from another group called The Orca Coalition (comprising seven organisations), which has employed a lawyer through funding raised by donations.  The Orca Coalition is now intending to confront the Netherlands Ministry of Economic Affairs, Agriculture and Innovation to prevent Morgan from being transferred to another marine mammal captive facility and instead for her to be moved to the proposed site of the sea-pen (Deltapark Neeltje Jans in The Netherlands), where she can begin her rehabilitation.

Great emphasis is placed on finding the family or home range of rehabilitated animals of all species which are returned to the wild.  The advantage for the animals is wide-ranging and can have many spin-offs to assist them in their return.  This includes the social support and local knowledge (such as places to find food).  Orca are well known for their strong social networks, with some populations having such strong bonds that individuals only join a group by being born into it and only leave by dying, whilst others have more of a fluid society with long-term and semi-long term bonds formed.  Morgan has been identified as belonging to the Norwegian fish-eating orca community (based on DNA analysis and supporting evidence from acoustical matching).  The social structure of the Norwegian orca has been studied to some degree, and both studies suggest that the "groups  seem to be social units based at least partly on stable membership".   One study also noted that there was communal care of young which may bode well for Morgan if she is given the opportunity to re-integrate into the population.

Individual Norwegian orca are known to travel some distance from the site of their original identification. Additionally, there have been sightings of orca in the North Sea since Morgan's capture.

There are many issues surrounding keeping orcas in captivity, including a reduced lifespan compared to orca in the wild.  Morgan has been in captivity since June 2011.  Her exact age is unknown, but when she was captured, she was estimated to be between one and four years old based on her size.  The reason for her ill-health and separation from her family remains unknown.  Morgan's young age offers both advantages and disadvantages to the arguments for her release.  Being young she is likely to still have a flexible attitude and therefore an ability to adapt to a return to the wild.  Against her release is, as previously mentioned, the lack of a positive identification of her family group and even that she may be too young to know the complete home range of her family, making it harder for her to find them. This last issue could possibly be solved with a ‘soft-release’ program which would allow Morgan to slowly build up her stamina as well as her knowledge of the area, albeit with the option to always return for food. A critical flaw in the release plan, however, has always been a lack of funding. Despite extensive effort by both the Orca Coalition and the Free Morgan Foundation to raise awareness and interest in their cause, funds raised did not even cover their legal fees. This led to a lesser case in court than their otherwise considerable presence in the case would have warranted.

If moved to another marine mammal captive facility, Morgan is likely to eventually be used in the captive breeding programs which many aquariums now advocate.  She would provide much-needed ‘new blood’ to prevent a population (or genetic) bottleneck in the captive orca population, as she presumably comes from an orca population not related to those orca currently in captivity.

On Wednesday, October 12, 2011, Agricultural Secretary Henk Bleker announced that Morgan would be transferred to a Spanish marine park known as Loro Parque. Animal activists involved within the Free Morgan Foundation continued their effort to stop the transfer of Morgan to the park, but Morgan was transferred on November 29, 2011. She joins a pod of second generation captive born orcas born in the Sea World Parks in the USA, and a third generation calf born in 2010.

On January 3, 2014, one of the activists against Morgans captivity, Geoffrey Deckers, said that an orca like Morgan has a value of $7 million. He said that the park's focal reason to adopt Morgan was to bring fresh DNA to their breeding program and to bring an attraction to their park. He instead argued for a policy to euthanize stranded orcas if they could not be returned to the ocean.

On April 23, 2014, the Council of State judged that the transfer to Loro Parque was lawful. The Council reasoned that the park had sufficient knowledge on the treatment of orcas. According to the Council a release Morgan was not an alternative for reasons that she belonged to a species of social animals while her family was not located and; that Morgan was young and it was unclear whether she could feed herself.

Life at Loro Parque

Upon Morgan's arrival at Loro Parque, she was introduced to one-year-old Adán and seven-year-old Skyla. Morgan was eventually introduced to the park's oldest female, Kohana (along with Skyla). According to various photographic sources, as of December 7, Morgan has also been introduced to eleven-year-old Tekoa, the park's second oldest male. Morgan has been introduced to sixteen-year-old Keto, the park's oldest male.

In May 2012 Loro Parque announced that Morgan is partially deaf as she suffers a profound hearing deficit that could even be full deafness, as probed by electrophysiological methods. According to the trainers at the park, Morgan barely responds to whistle signals, but she does respond well to hand and arm gestures.

In June 2016, video surfaced of Morgan supposedly beaching herself on stage. The video was released by the animal rights group, the Dolphin Project, along with a video of Morgan banging her head repeatedly against a metal gate inside her enclosure.

On December 3, 2017, it was announced that Morgan was pregnant. Morgan gave birth to her calf on September 22, 2018. She immediately took to the calf and the two are bonding. The calf was later named Ula and the father is Keto.
Unfortunately, Ula has passed on the 10th of August 2021.

See also
 List of individual cetaceans

References

External links
 Free Morgan Foundation
 Column (in Dutch) about Morgan by blogger Peter Miedema

Individual orcas
Wildlife rehabilitation
Solitary dolphins
Wayward cetaceans
2007 animal births
Dolfinarium Harderwijk